EcoTeach is a non-profit organization founded by Ralph Carlson of Suquamish, Washington that works with communities in Costa Rica, Mexico, Peru,  and Alaska to help preserve local resources.

Since being established in 1999 EcoTeach has taken more than 5,000 groups of students, families and individuals on guided tours through these areas.  On these tours groups have the chance to experience the culture and also partake in activities such as turtle protection, home stays with local families, river rafting, zip line canopy tours and other conservation efforts.  Each tour is led by experienced naturalists.

References

External links
 EcoTeach

Ecotourism
Environmental organizations based in the United States